Anakapalle railway station (Station CODE: AKP) is a railway station in Anakapalle, a neighbourhood of Visakhapatnam Anakapalli district in Andhra Pradesh. It lies on the Vijayawada–Chennai section and is administered under Vijayawada railway division of South Coast Railway zone (formerly South Central Railway zone).

Classification 
In terms of earnings and outward passengers handled, Anakapalle is categorized as a Non-Suburban Grade-4 (NSG-4) railway station. Based on the re–categorization of Indian Railway stations for the period of 2017–18 and 2022–23, an NSG–4 category station earns between – crore and handles  passengers.

Structure and amenities 
The station has roof top solar panels installed by the Indian railways, along with various railway stations and service buildings in the country, as a part of sourcing 500 MW solar energy. It is one of the 38 stations in the division to be equipped with Automatic Ticket Vending Machines (ATVMs).

References

External links 

Railway stations in Visakhapatnam district
Vijayawada railway division